Chris Akomas is a Nigerian politician. He served as the Deputy Governor of Abia State from 2007 to 2010.

References 

Living people
Igbo people
People from Abia State
Year of birth missing (living people)